Philippine Airlines Flight S26 was a domestic flight operated by Philippine Airlines that departed from Mandurriao Airport in Iloilo on 23 November 1960 at 5:30 p.m. to Manila International Airport in Manila. At 6:33 p.m. the crew gave its last position report before crashing on the slopes of Mount Baco at 6,000 feet. The wreckage was found on 30 November and there were no survivors.

Aircraft 
The aircraft was a Douglas DC-3 manufactured in the United States during World War II and purchased by Philippine Airlines in 1946. The plane was acquired in 1948 and registered as PI-C142 a year later.

In 1953, PI-C142 made a forced landing in a rice paddy near Tuguegarao with no fatalities. It was repaired and re-registered to PI-C133 in 1954.

The plane had around 18,000 flight hours at the time of the crash.

Probable cause 
The probable cause was possibly a navigational error, as there were adverse weather conditions, poor visibility, a 25-knot eastern crosswind and a possible malfunction of the airborne navigational equipment due to atmospheric disturbance and night and terrain effects.

References 

S26
Aviation accidents and incidents in 1969
20th-century aviation accidents and incidents
Aviation accidents and incidents in the Philippines
Accidents and incidents involving the Douglas DC-3
Airliner accidents and incidents involving controlled flight into terrain
1969 disasters in the Philippines